Sandipanrao Bhumre is an Indian politician and he is Shiv Sena leader from Aurangabad District, Marathwada. He had been elected to Vidhan Sabha for 5 terms in 1995, 1999, 2004, 2014 and 2019. He is Chairman of Renuka Devi-Sharad Sahakari Sugar Factory, At.Vihamandwa, Tq.Paithan, Dist.Aurangabad. 

Newly appointed - Guardian Minister of Aurangabad (Chh. Sambhajinagar) .

Former Guardian Minister of Yavatmal District, Maharashtra. (May 2020 - July 2022)

Positions held
 1995: Elected to Maharashtra Legislative Assembly (1st term) 
 1999: Re-elected to Maharashtra Legislative Assembly (2nd term) 
 2004: Re-elected to Maharashtra Legislative Assembly (3rd term)
 2014: Re-elected to Maharashtra Legislative Assembly (4th term) 
 2019: Re-elected to Maharashtra Legislative Assembly (5th term)
 2019: Appointed minister of Employment Guarantee and Horticulture MH

References

External links
  Shivsena Home Page 
 संदिपानराव भुमरेचे खरेदी विक्री संघावर पुन्हा वर्चस्व
 रोजगार हमी योजना समितीवर सदस्यांची नियुक्ती

Living people
Maharashtra MLAs 1995–1999
Maharashtra MLAs 1999–2004
Maharashtra MLAs 2004–2009
Maharashtra MLAs 2014–2019
Shiv Sena politicians
People from Aurangabad district, Maharashtra
Marathi politicians
Year of birth missing (living people)